Empire of the Senseless is an album by the English rock band Senseless Things. It was released in 1993, and was produced by Senseless Things and Ralph Jezzard. It was not released in the United States.

The album peaked at #37 on the Official Albums Chart. "Homophobic Asshole" was the album's first single.

Track listing
All tracks composed by Mark Keds; except where indicated
"Homophobic Asshole" (Ben Harding)
"Keepsake"
"Tempting Kate"
"Hold It Down" (Morgan Nicholls)
"Counting Friends"
"Just One Reason"
"Cruel Moon"
"Primary Instinct"
"Rise" (Song for Dean and Gene)
"Ice Skating at The Milky Way"
"Say What You Will"
"Runaways"

References

1993 albums
Senseless Things albums
Epic Records albums